Xəlilli (also, Khalilli, Khalli, and Khayli) is a village and municipality in the Agsu Rayon of Azerbaijan.  It has a population of 749.

References 

Populated places in Agsu District